Phra Nakhon Si Ayutthaya (also spelled "Ayudhya"), or locally and simply Ayutthaya, is the former capital of Phra Nakhon Si Ayutthaya province in Thailand. Located on an island at the confluence of the Chao Phraya and Pa Sak rivers, Ayutthaya is the birthplace of the founder of Bangkok, King Rama I.

Etymology

Ayutthaya is named after the city of Ayodhya in India, the birthplace of Rama in the Ramayana (Thai, Ramakien);  (from Khmer: preah ព្រះ ) is a prefix for a noun concerning a royal person;  designates an important or capital city (from Sanskrit: nagara); the Thai honorific sri or si is from the Indian term of veneration Shri.

History

Prior to Ayutthaya's traditional founding date, archaeological and written evidence has revealed that Ayutthaya may have existed as early as the late 13th century as a water-borne port town. Further evidence of this can be seen with Wat Phanan Choeng, which was founded in 1324, 27 years before Ayutthaya's official foundation.

Ayutthaya was officially founded in 1351 by King U Thong, who went there to escape a smallpox outbreak in Lopburi and proclaimed it the capital of his kingdom, often referred to as the Ayutthaya Kingdom or Siam. It is named after the ancient Indian city of Ayodhya, synonymous with Rama, the 7th incarnation of the Hindu God Vishnu. Ayutthaya became the second Siamese capital after Sukhothai. It is estimated that Ayutthaya by the year 1600 had a population of about 300,000, with the population perhaps reaching 1,000,000 around 1700, making it one of the world's largest cities at that time, when it was sometimes known as the "Venice of the East".

In 1767, the city was destroyed by the Burmese army, resulting in the collapse of the kingdom. The ruins of the old city are preserved in the Ayutthaya historical park, which is recognised internationally as a UNESCO World Heritage Site. The ruins, characterised by the prang (reliquary towers) and gigantic monasteries, give an idea of the city's past splendour. Modern Ayutthaya was refounded a few kilometres to the east.

Population 
Since 2005, the population of Ayutthaya has been declining.

Geography

Climate
Ayutthaya, located in the central plains, is affected by three seasons:
Hot Season: March – May
Rainy season: June – October
Cool season: November – February

Ayutthaya City Sites

Notable cultural sites

Museums
Ayutthaya Historical Study Centre
Chao Sam Phraya National Museum: The museum was specially display the objects excavated at Wat Racha Burana and Wat Maha That.

Other tourism sites

Wang Luang
Wat Suwan Dararam
St. Joseph's Church
 Baan Hollanda
The city is located at the junction of the Chao Phraya, Lopburi and Pa Sak rivers, and on the main north–south railway linking Chiang Mai to Bangkok. The old city is on an island formed by a bend of the Chao Phraya on the west and south sides, the Pa Sak on the east side and the Klong Muang canal on the northern side.

Ayutthaya Night Market 
The market offers a plethora of shopping opportunities, including a wide variety of food, clothing, and handicrafts. Visitors can enjoy traditional Thai dishes such as pad Thai, mango sticky rice, and tom yum soup, as well as a range of international cuisine. The market is also famous for its impressive array of souvenirs, including handmade bags, jewelry, and textiles. The atmosphere is lively and energetic, with street performers, music, and colorful lights adding to the festive ambiance.

The Floating Market of Ayutthaya 
There is a lesser-known floating market in Ayutthaya called Klong Sabua which is more popular with Thai tourists than foreign travellers.

It’s only open on weekends and public holidays from 10AM to 5.30PM. I have heard it was closed down for a while due to the floods in this part of the country – hopefully, it has re-opened by now.

The main attraction is a Water Theatre, said to be the only one of its kind in Thailand, featuring live performances of Thai folk tales and Sepaa musicals.

Transport

Ayutthaya is accessible by air and rail.

Air
The closest airport is Bangkok's Don Mueang International Airport, a hub for regional budget carriers. An elevated walkway connects Terminal 1 to the Don Muang Train Station, where Ayutthaya-bound trains regularly roll through.

Rail
Trains to Ayutthaya leave Bangkok's Hua Lamphong Station approximately every hour between 04:20 am. and 10:00 pm. The 3rd class fare is 20 baht for the 1.5 hour trip. Train schedules are available from the information booth at Hua Lamphong Station, Bangkok.

In fiction
A Thailand-themed town named "Ayothaya" appears in the personal computer MMORPG Ragnarok Online.
Ayutthaya is a stage in Soul Calibur II.
The temples in Wat Phra Si Sanphet and Wat Ratchaburana from Ayutthaya appear in Street Fighter II, Kickboxer (as "Stone City"), Mortal Kombat, Mortal Kombat Annihilation, and throughout Mortal Kombat Conquest.
The lying Buddha statue from the Ayutthaya ruins appears in Sagat's stage in most of the Street Fighter games.
It was featured in the 2005 movie "The King Maker".
The 1630 destruction of the Japanese quarter of Ayutthaya at the orders of Prasat Thong and its consequences is central to one of the stories in the 1632 series anthology Ring of Fire III, "All God's Children in the Burning East" by Garrett W. Vance.
In the 2010 Nintendo DS game Golden Sun: Dark Dawn, the main characters visit the city of 'Ayuthay', which draws heavily on Thai culture and architecture.
A Thailand-themed map named "Ayutthaya" appears in the video game Overwatch.

Gallery

Notes

 The city was founded on Friday, the 6th day of the waxing moon of the 5th month, 1893 Buddhist Era, corresponding to Friday, 4 March 1351 Common Era, according to the calculation of the Fine Arts Department of Thailand.

See also
 Ayutthaya Historical Park

References

Further reading
 Stefan Halikowski Smith, Creolization and Diaspora in the Portuguese Indies: The Social World of Ayutthaya, 1640-1720 (Leiden, Brill, 2011) (European Expansion and Indigenous Response, 8).

External links

http://www.ayutthaya.go.th/eng_travel.htm Website of municipality

Populated places in Phra Nakhon Si Ayutthaya province
1350 establishments in Asia
Populated places established in the 1350s
Buddhist pilgrimage sites in Thailand
Cities and towns in Thailand
14th-century establishments in Thailand
Populated places on the Chao Phraya River
River islands of Thailand